The Literary and Scientific Society (commonly referred to as the Literific) of the Queen's University of Belfast is the university's debating society. The purposes of the Society, as per its Laws are to "encourage debating, oratory and rhetoric throughout the student body of the University and beyond".

History
The Society was founded in 1850 as a paper-reading society for students of the new Queen's College, with its first president being Edwin Lawrence Godkin. The Literific was also used, during its early years, as a democratic body which could negotiate with the College on behalf of the students until the formation of the Students' Union Society and the Students' Representative Council in 1900. 

The Society established itself as the principal debating body of the University, however in the 1960s the Literific came under fire and was banned for several weeks in 1964 "in view of the disorders and improprieties of conduct and obscene language". Later in the decade the Society merged into the Union Debating Society (later the Debating and Mooting Society) from which it re-emerged in 2011.

Currently the Society operates as the sole debating society at QUB and has an affiliation with the Queen's University Belfast Students' Union as well as to the University itself. The Society holds weekly meetings on a particular motion of interest during term.

Events

Irish Times 
In 2018 the Literific, supported by the QUB Law Society, hosted the 58th Grand Final of the Irish Times Debate at which the Training Officer of the 170th session spoke as an individual finalist. The Event saw 12 speakers discuss the motion: “This House Believes That Ireland Has Failed Its Youth”. The debate was chaired by Lord Justice Stephens and judged by Irish Times editor Paul O’Neill, Queen’s Professor Adrienne Scullion, Pro Vice-Chancellor for Arts, Humanities and Social Sciences; Margaret Elliott who is a governor of the Irish Times Trust and Professor Brent Northup, the chair of communications at Carroll College in Montana.

LitTalks and Great Debates 
In 2020, the Literific launched two new series called LitTalks and Great Debates. The first LitTalk took  place in February 2020 with James Brokenshire, then Minister of State for Security and former Secretary of State for Northern Ireland. Other LitTalks have included Mary Lou McDonald, Ian Blackford, Naomi Long and Doug Beattie.

In November 2020, the first Great Debate was held on the motion: This House Regrets the Decriminalisation of Abortion in Northern Ireland. The debate attracted much controversy on social media, particularly due to the inclusion of former Shadow Home Secretary Anne Widdecombe on the proposition. The motion was defeated by 472 votes to 159.

Presidents

Notable people
Edwin Lawrence Godkin - First president of the Society, later editor of The Nation and the New York Evening Post.
Robert James McMordie - President 1871-72, barrister, M.P. and Lord Mayor of Belfast.
Thomas Teevan - President of the Society, barrister and Ulster Unionist West Belfast MP - Youngest Chairman of a local Authority in Northern Ireland at 21 (Limavady Urban Council). He was also President of the Queen's Law Society and Chairman of the Unionist Association.
Sheelagh Murnaghan - President 1946-47, first female president of the Society, barrister and Ireland Women's hockey player, later Northern Ireland M.P. for the Ulster Liberal Party.
Eamonn McCann - President 1964-65, writer and political activist. Only individual Q.U.B. winner of the Irish Times Debate.
Cyril Toman - President 1965-66, Northern Irish political activist.

See also
Queen's University Belfast Students' Union
Literary and Historical Society (University College Dublin)
College Historical Society
University Philosophical Society
UCC Philosophical Society

References 

Student debating societies
Clubs and societies of Queen's University Belfast
Student organisations in Northern Ireland